Gill Toby Todor Swerts (born 23 September 1982) is a Belgian former professional footballer who played as a right-back.

Career
Swerts was born in Brasschaat, Belgium and made his debut in professional football as part of the Excelsior squad in the 2001–02 season. He also played for Feyenoord, ADO Den Haag, Vitesse and AZ before returning to Feyenoord in January 2011. He was part of the AZ team winning the 2008–09 Eredivisie. After that, he played for SønderjyskE in Denmark, NAC Breda, and Notts County in England.

In early 2016, his contract with Notts County was terminated by mutual consent due to a lack of playing time. In October 2016, Swerts joined RFC Seraing in the third-tier Belgian National Division 1. In January 2018, Swerts moved to KFC Lille in the sixth-tier Eerste Provinciale Antwerpen.

In June 2019, Swerts announced his retirement from football, and would instead focus on coaching youth players at Royal Antwerp.

Personal life
His father is originally from Congo.

Career statistics

|}

Honours
AZ
Eredivisie: 2008–09

References

External links
 
 
 Voetbal International profile 
 
 

1982 births
Living people
People from Brasschaat
Belgian people of Democratic Republic of the Congo descent
Belgian footballers
Footballers from Antwerp Province
Association football midfielders
Association football defenders
Belgium international footballers
Belgium under-21 international footballers
Belgium youth international footballers
Excelsior Rotterdam players
Feyenoord players
ADO Den Haag players
SBV Vitesse players
AZ Alkmaar players
Eredivisie players
Eerste Divisie players
SønderjyskE Fodbold players
Danish Superliga players
Notts County F.C. players
English Football League players
Belgian expatriate footballers
Belgian expatriate sportspeople in Denmark
Expatriate men's footballers in Denmark
Belgian expatriate sportspeople in the Netherlands
Expatriate footballers in the Netherlands
Belgian expatriate sportspeople in England
Expatriate footballers in England